Daniel Gookin   was the first sheriff of Worcester County, Massachusetts.

He was born about 1687/8, at Cambridge, Massachusetts, the son of Samuel Gookins and his wife née Mary Larkin, and the grandson of Major-General Daniel Gookin.

Gookin was appointed the first sheriff of Worcester County, Massachusetts on June 30, 1741.

Death
Gookin died in June 1743.

Notes

Sheriffs of Worcester County, Massachusetts
People from Worcester County, Massachusetts
1743 deaths
18th-century American people
Year of birth missing
People from Cambridge, Massachusetts